Philipp Kukura FRSC (born 26 March 1978) is Professor of Chemistry at the University of Oxford, and a Fellow of Exeter College, Oxford. He is best known for pioneering contributions to femtosecond stimulated Raman spectroscopy (FSRS), interferometric scattering microscopy (iSCAT) and the development of mass photometry.

Education and early life
He was born in Bratislava, then Czechoslovakia in a family of Slovak actor Juraj Kukura. In 1984 the family emigrated to Germany. In 2002 he graduated with a Master of Chemistry from the University of Oxford. In 2006 he completed his PhD in Chemistry from the University of California, Berkeley College of Chemistry.

Career and research
After completing his PhD, Philipp Kukura moved to Zürich. There he worked at the Swiss Federal Institute of Technology as a postdoctoral research assistant under the supervision of Professor Vahid Sandoghdar on nano-optics until 2010. He returned to Oxford in 2010 to work initially as an EPSRC Career Acceleration Fellow. In 2011 he was elected to a tutorial fellowship at Exeter College. In 2016 he was promoted to Full Professor of Chemistry.  

In 2018 Philipp Kukura founded Refeyn Ltd. to commercialise mass photometry.

Selected publications

Honours and awards
 2002 Thesis Prize, Oxford University
 2006 Society of Spectroscopy Graduate Student Award
 2010 EPSRC Career Acceleration Fellowship
 2011 Elected Fellow of the Royal Society of Chemistry 
 2011 Royal Society of Chemistry Harrison-Meldola Award
 2014 Visiting Professor at University of Erlangen–Nuremberg 
 2014 European Research Council Starting Investigator Grant
 2015 Royal Society of Chemistry Marlow Award 
 2015 Visiting Professor at Sapienza University of Rome
 2017 EBSA Young Investigator Award and Medal 
 2018 Blavatnik Awards for Young Scientists UK (Chemistry) Finalist
 2018 Klung Wilhelmy Science Award (Chemistry)
 2018 Royal Society Wolfson Research Merit Award
 2019 Blavatnik Awards for Young Scientists UK (Chemistry) Laureate
 2021 RMS Medal for Light Microscopy

References

External links
Professor Kukura’s personal page on Exeter College web 
Kukura group page on Oxford University web 
Philipp Kukura on Blavatnik Awards Young Scientists page
Refeyn Ltd. official web 

1978 births
Scientists from Bratislava
Slovak chemists
Fellows of Exeter College, Oxford
Alumni of St Hugh's College, Oxford
University of California, Berkeley alumni
Statutory Professors of the University of Oxford
Physical chemists
Living people